Edith Guillén Chavarria (born 5 March 1985) is a Costa Rican racing cyclist. She competed in the 2013 UCI women's road race in Florence.

Major results

2008
 2nd Time trial, National Road Championships
2009
 National Road Championships
2nd Time trial
2nd Road race
 5th Overall Vuelta Internacional Femenina a Costa Rica
2011
 National Road Championships
2nd Road race
3rd Time trial
2012
 National Road Championships
2nd Time trial
2nd Road race
2013
 National Road Championships
1st  Road race
3rd Time trial
 5th Road race, Pan American Road Championships
 7th Overall Vuelta Internacional Femenina a Costa Rica
2014
 1st  Time trial, National Road Championships
 5th Overall Vuelta Internacional Femenina a Costa Rica
 Central American and Caribbean Games
9th Time trial
10th Road race
2015
 2nd Road race, National Road Championships
 9th Overall Vuelta Internacional Femenina a Costa Rica
2016
 9th Overall Vuelta Internacional Femenina a Costa Rica
2017
 2nd Time trial, National Road Championships
2018
 3rd Road race, National Road Championships
 10th Gran Premio Comite Olimpico Nacional Femenino

References

External links

1985 births
Living people
Costa Rican female cyclists
Cyclists at the 2015 Pan American Games
Pan American Games competitors for Costa Rica
Place of birth missing (living people)